Human Resources is a 1999 French-British comedy-drama film directed by Laurent Cantet. As the title implies, the subject of the film is the workplace and the personal difficulties that result from conflicts among management and labour, corporations and individuals. It stars Jalil Lespert. Most of the other actors are non-professionals. It won the César Award for Best First Feature Film and the César Award for Most Promising Actor at the 26th César Awards.

Plot
In Gaillon, Normandy, "good son" Franck returns to his hometown to do a trainee managerial internship in the Human Resources department of the factory where his anxious, taciturn father has worked on the shop floor for 30 years. At first, Franck is lauded by both friends and family for breaking through the glass ceiling and becoming "white-collar". But very soon hidden envy and rivalries erupt. Franck forms a friendship with Alain, a young worker whom his father has mentored. This mentoring in the blue-collar workforce is contrasted with the cagier, trust-less mentoring Franck receives in the white-collar world from his own supervisor, Chambon.

Franck discovers that his boss is going to use Franck's field study on the proposed 35-hour workweek to justify downsizing - and that Franck's father is among those to be let go. This leads to a confrontation between the trainee and management, between the workers and the owners, and ultimately between son and father. In the emotional climax, Franck confronts his father and accuses him of imbuing him with a legacy of shame at being blue-collar.

Cast

Critical response
Human Resources received generally positive reviews from critics. On Rotten Tomatoes, the film has a rating of 97%, based on 32 reviews. On Metacritic, the film has a score of 78 out of 100, based on 25 critics, indicating "generally favorable reviews".

Stephen Holden of The New York Times wrote, "As schematic as it becomes, Human Resources never loses its poignant human dimension. It is so beautifully acted that the cast, especially the nonprofessional actors playing the embattled factory workers, seems plucked from the streets of a provincial French town." Sight & Sound described the film as "generous, sensitive and innovative. It is a film in which, in the widest possible sense, the personal is political." Mick LaSalle of the San Francisco Chronicle said it "is a rare film about the class and educational divide that can happen even within families", while Lisa Schwarzbaum of Entertainment Weekly called it "a compelling, cant-free drama about clashing class systems and challenged family relationships that's all the more engrossing for its organic, near-documentary style", and gave the film an "A-" grade.

Awards and nominations 

 César Awards 
 Winner – Most Promising Actor (Jalil Lespert)
 Winner – Best First Work (Laurent Cantet)
 Nominee – Best Original Screenplay (Laurent Cantet, Gilles Marchand) 
 Emden International Film Festival 
 Winner – Award of the German Unions Association (Laurent Cantet) 
 European Film Awards 
 Winner – European Discovery of the Year (Laurent Cantet) 
 Lumiere Awards
 Winner – Most Promising Young Actor (Jalil Lespert)
 Louis Delluc Prize 
 Winner – Best First Film (Laurent Cantet)
 San Sebastián International Film Festival 
 Winner – Best New Director (Laurent Cantet)
 Seattle International Film Festival 
 Winner – New Director's Showcase Award (Laurent Cantet)
 Thessaloniki International Film Festival
 Winner – Best Screenplay (Laurent Cantet, Gilles Marchand)
 Nominee – Golden Alexander (Laurent Cantet)
 Torino Film Festival
 Winner – Best First Feature Film (Laurent Cantet)
 Winner – Cipputi Award (Laurent Cantet)
 Winner – Special Mention for Feature Film (Jean-Claude Vallod)
 Nominee – Best Feature Film (Laurent Cantet)

References

External links

A conversation with Laurent Cantet

1999 films
Films about the labor movement
Films set in factories
Films about social issues in France
Films about social class
Films about labor relations
Workplace comedy films
Films directed by Laurent Cantet
British drama films
French drama films
1990s French-language films
1999 drama films
Best First Feature Film César Award winners
Louis Delluc Prize winners
European Film Awards winners (films)
1999 independent films
1999 directorial debut films
1990s British films
1990s French films